Bakula Namdeo Ghotale is a 2007 Indian Marathi-language comedy drama film directed by Kedar Shinde, and the debut film of Actress Sonalee Kulkarni. The film stars Bharat Jadhav, Siddharth Jadhav, Sonalee Kulkarni, Vijay Chavan, and Kushal Badrike.

Synopsis  
Bhakaspur is the name of a remote town in Maharashtra. Troubled under obligations from their questionable sarpanch "Ghotale", the villagers have no time for something besides trudging and reimbursing their obligations. The tutoring of their youngsters or the advance of their town is of no worry to them. The whole town is controlled by Ghotale, and every one of the villagers concur and tolerate to each guideline given by him as every one of their properties and homes are pawned to Ghotale. The highlight of Ghotale's character is that as much as his activities appear to be clever, his insidious streak has no limits.

In a similar town, there is a nitwit named "Namdev", who returns to his town in the wake of getting hitched to "Bakula". According to the customs, he goes straight to Ghotale's home with his better half to look for his gifts. Be that as it may, one take a gander at his significant other and Ghotale is left confused. He is completely amazed by Bakula and falls head over heels in affection with her. Without even a second's pause, he chooses in his brain to get hitched to her, by snare or by hooligan. In spite of Namdev being a vital piece of Bakula's life, Ghotale tries to charm her in his own specific manner. Namdev, thus, tries to keep her out of Ghotale's path and in this disarray, all Bakula needs is to lead a glad wedded existence with her better half.

Ghotale's charm, Namdev's straightforwardness and Bakula's one good turn deserves another demeanor with Ghotale provides much comedy.

Cast  
 Bharat Jadhav 
 Siddharth Jadhav 
 Sonalee Kulkarni 
 Vijay Chavan 
 Kushal Badrike 
 Ganesh Revdekar
 Ghanashyam Ghorpade 
 Prashant Gore 
 Rajan Deshmukh 
 Varsha Kambli 
 Uma Rane 
 Gitanjali Kambli 
 Archana Gaekwad 
 Bhakti Jadhav 
 Bimega Khamkar 
 Jayraj Nair 
 Sandip Sarode 
 Manoj Takne
 Machchindra More 
 Resham Tipnis

References 

2000s Marathi-language films
2007 comedy films
2007 films